Korean Air Flight 631 (KE631/KAL631) was a scheduled passenger flight from Incheon International Airport near Seoul, South Korea to Mactan–Cebu International Airport in Metro Cebu, Philippines. On October 23, 2022, the Airbus A330-300 operating this flight overran the runway while landing in Cebu due to hydraulic failure. Despite what reports described as a "terrifying close call," all passengers and crew members survived without injuries. The aircraft was damaged beyond repair and written off as a result of the accident, making it the 14th hull loss of an Airbus A330.

The crash is the 17th Korean Air crash since 1970 that resulted in a total write off of aircraft and the first in 23 years.

Aircraft 
The aircraft involved in the accident was a 24-year-old Airbus A330-322, with manufacturer serial number 219, registered as HL7525. It first flew on 12 May 1998, and was delivered brand new to Korean Air on 26 June 1998. The aircraft was powered by two Pratt & Whitney PW4168 engines.

Accident 
The flight departed Seoul at 19:20 KST (10:20 UTC) and was scheduled to land at Cebu at 22:00 PHT (14:00 UTC). At about 22:12 PHT (14:12 UTC), KE631 was on final approach to Mactan–Cebu's runway 22 when it executed a go-around. A second landing attempt at 22:26 was unsuccessful. Subsequently, the aircraft circled northeast of Cebu for approximately 30 minutes before conducting a third approach. On the third attempt, the aircraft successfully touched down at 23:08, but was unable to stop on the runway.

The aircraft continued past the end of the runway, striking an instrument landing system lighting array before stopping  beyond the runway threshold. According to eyewitness accounts, "The instrument landing system lighting array laid over the wings of the aircraft once the aircraft was stopped in the marsh."

As the aircraft landed on runway 22, there was a 9-knot headwind present. Other planes decided to divert due to weather prior to KE631's landing attempts, but there is no information on the time span between the other diversions and the Korean Air flight.

Aftermath 
As the result of the accident, flights to Cebu were forced to either return to their origin airport, divert to Francisco Bangoy International Airport in Davao or to Ninoy Aquino International Airport in Manila. More than 100 flights were cancelled entirely.

Korean Air published an apology on their Instagram account, stating "A thorough investigation will be performed together with the local aviation authorities and Korean authorities to determine the cause(s) of this event."

Commentators noted that "there are many unanswered questions" including why the flight crew of this flight chose to attempt the landing when no other pilots deemed it safe. News reports noted the similarities to previous crashes on Korean Air that were caused by pilot error and the airline's historic safety culture.

After another incident where an engine of another Korean Air Airbus A330 had malfunctioned after takeoff, Korean Air announced it will be grounding the entirety of its Airbus A330 fleet, pending a safety audit.

Since October 31, 2022, Korean Air changed the Seoul–Cebu route flight number from KE631 to KE615. The return flight to Seoul, KE632, was also changed to KE616. 

Two weeks after the accident, HL7525's livery and logo were removed, though the aircraft has yet to be removed from the accident site.

Investigation 
The accident is being investigated by the Civil Aviation Authority of the Philippines (CAAP), with assistance from 40 officers from the Korean Office of Civil Aviation (KOCA) who arrived at Bohol after the accident.

On October 24, 2022, Philippines authorities as well as Korean Ministry of Land, Infrastructure and Transport released a preliminary report that concluded that a hydraulic failure had caused the failure of brakes on the aircraft.

On October 25, 2022, it was reported that the captain of the flight provided testimony that they suffered a hard touchdown on their second approach due to wind shear forcing them down. During the following go-around, a warning light regarding the brakes lit up. The crew therefore declared an emergency. On the third landing attempt, a warning light regarding the pressure of the brakes lit up and the pilots could not slow down the aircraft.

See also 

 Korean Air incidents and accidents
 Runway excursion
 Air France Flight 358
 Korean Air Flight 2033 – an Airbus A300 of the same airline which skidded off the runway at Jeju 28 years before the Flight 631 accident.
 Philippine Airlines Flight 137 – another runway excursion incident in the Philippines that happened 24 years prior

References 

Aviation accidents and incidents in 2022
Accidents and incidents involving the Airbus A330
Korean Air accidents and incidents
Aviation accidents and incidents in the Philippines
2022 disasters in the Philippines
October 2022 events in the Philippines
Lapu-Lapu City
History of Cebu